Tony Lamborn (born 31 July 1991) is a New Zealand-born American rugby union player who plays as a flanker. He currently plays his club rugby for Southland in the Mitre 10 Cup, and the Blues in the Super Rugby competition. He also played for the United States national rugby union team.

Career
Lamborn was educated at Ashburton College. He left school at age 16 and travelled to Havelock North.

Lamborn played for Hawke's Bay U18 and U20 teams.

Lamborn debuted for the Magpies in 2013, however it was in 2015 when his performances really started to catch the eye. Subsequently, he was named as a member of the  wider training group ahead of the 2016 Super Rugby season.

International
In May 2016, Lamborn was named to the United States national rugby union team for their June 2016 tests. He qualified to play for the Eagles due to his father and other relatives being American.

Family 
Lamborn is the cousin of James King, a former Blues and Melbourne Rebels Super Rugby player.

References

1991 births
Living people
New Zealand rugby union players
American rugby union players
Rugby union flankers
Hawke's Bay rugby union players
Rugby union players from Timaru
Hurricanes (rugby union) players
United States international rugby union players
Rugby union number eights
San Diego Legion players
New Orleans Gold players
Blues (Super Rugby) players
Melbourne Rebels players
Southland rugby union players